"The Surprises of the Superhuman" is a poem from Wallace Stevens's first book
of poetry,  Harmonium. It
was first published in 1918, so it is in the public
domain.

This poem was Section V of the poem-sequence "Lettres d'un Soldat"
(1918). It was extracted as "The Surprises of the Superhuman" for the
second edition of Harmonium, along with "Negation"; the two poems
adjoin each other near the end of the book. Both poems reflect
Stevens's reading of Nietzsche. Bates comments that it contrasts the
bourgeois concept of justice with that suitable to
"Űbermenschlichkeit".

Notes

References 
 Bates, Milton J. A Mythology of Self. 1985: University of California Press.

1918 poems
American poems
Poetry by Wallace Stevens